Mohammed Hassan Moussa (5 February 1905 – 16 February 1973) was an Egyptian footballer who played as a forward. At club level, he played for Al-Masry; he also represented Egypt internationally at the 1934 FIFA World Cup. He was also part of Egypt's squad for the 1928 Summer Olympics, but he did not play in any matches.

References

External links
 

1905 births
1973 deaths
Egyptian footballers
Sportspeople from Port Said
Association football forwards
Al Masry SC players
Egypt international footballers
1934 FIFA World Cup players